My Old Duchess is a 1934 British comedy film directed by Lupino Lane and starring George Lacy, Betty Ann Davies and Dennis Hoey. The film was made at Elstree Studios. It was based on an original sketch by Fred Karno. The screenplay concerns a stage manager who disguises himself as a duchess.

The film is also known as Oh, What a Duchess!, the title under which it has been released on DVD.

Plot summary
In an effort to impress a film producer, a stage manager disguises himself as a duchess.

Cast
 George Lacy as Irving
 Betty Ann Davies as Sally Martin
 Dennis Hoey as Montagu Neilson
 Fred Duprez as Jesse Martin
 Renée Macready as Valerie
 Florence Vie as Mrs Neilson
 Hugh E. Wright as Higgins
 Patrick Aherne as Gaston

References

Bibliography
 Low, Rachael. Filmmaking in 1930s Britain. George Allen & Unwin, 1985.
 Wood, Linda. British Films, 1927-1939. British Film Institute, 1986.

External links

1934 films
1934 comedy films
1930s LGBT-related films
British black-and-white films
British comedy films
Cross-dressing in film
Films shot at British International Pictures Studios
Films directed by Lupino Lane
Films set in England
1930s English-language films
1930s British films